John Thomas Holden (13 March 1907 – 7 March 2004) was a long-distance runner from England, who won four consecutive national titles in the marathon (1947–1950).

Athletics career
He represented Great Britain at the 1948 Summer Olympics in London, but abandoned the race due to foot blisters. He won the 1950 Empire Games marathon in Auckland, running the last nine miles barefoot after his shoes fell apart during the race.

He competed for England in the 3 and 6 miles at the 1934 British Empire Games in London. He competed for England at the 1938 British Empire Games in the 6 miles and marathon.

He was also a successful cross country runner, becoming the first man to win the International Cross Country Championships four times, which he did between 1933 and 1939.

Personal life
During World War II Holden served with the Royal Air Force. In the 1950s, Coseley Urban District Council named a new road on the Woodcross housing estate Jack Holden Avenue in honour of this local sporting legend. On 23 July 1952, Jack Holden's Gardens were opened on Queens Road, Tipton.

Holden died in March 2004, six days before his 97th birthday. He was survived by daughter Joan and son-in-law Brian.

References

External links
 Jack Holden Obituary. The Times. 26 March 2004
 Simon Turnbull (11 January 2004) Athletics: Magical memories of those olden Holden golden days. The Independent

1907 births
2004 deaths
Military personnel from Staffordshire
Royal Air Force personnel of World War II
Royal Air Force airmen
People from Bilston
Sportspeople from Tipton
English male marathon runners
Olympic athletes of Great Britain
Athletes (track and field) at the 1948 Summer Olympics
Commonwealth Games gold medallists for England
Commonwealth Games medallists in athletics
Athletes (track and field) at the 1950 British Empire Games
European Athletics Championships medalists
International Cross Country Championships winners
Medallists at the 1950 British Empire Games